Dundalk entered the 2013 season having spent the 2012 season rooted in the relegation play-off spot. The club had been put up for sale, and, with the assistance of a Supporters Trust, it was taken over by local businessmen Andy Connolly and Paul Brown (owners of the team's official sponsors, Fastfix). They subsequently managed to remain in the top-flight by winning a promotion/relegation play-off. With the takeover complete and the club saved, the new owners turned to Stephen Kenny - out of work since being sacked by Shamrock Rovers - to become the new manager ahead of the season. 2013 was Dundalk's fifth consecutive season in the top tier of Irish football, their 78th in all, and their 87th in the League of Ireland.

Season summary
When the 33 round League programme commenced on 8 March 2013, neither supporters nor pundits were sure what to expect, and Dundalk failed to win any of the first five home matches. But with Kenny's team clicking into gear as his ideas took hold, they rose up the table to mount an unexpected title challenge, eventually finishing second - a defeat to eventual champions St. Patrick's Athletic ultimately costing them the title.

In the cup competitions, they exited in both the second round of the League Cup, and the quarter-final of the Leinster Senior Cup, to Shamrock Rovers. They reached the semi-final of the FAI Cup and were defeated 1–0 away to 'Louth Derby' rivals, Drogheda United, in a tempestuous game - referee Anthony Buttimer sent off two Dundalk players inside half an hour, and Drogheda took the lead from the penalty spot after the second red card. But the nine men of Dundalk prevented Drogheda scoring again.

First-Team Squad (2013)
Sources:

Competitions

Premier Division

FAI Cup
Source:
Second Round

Third Round

Quarter Final

Semi Final

League Cup
Source:
First Round

Second Round

Leinster Senior Cup
Source:
Fourth Round

Quarter Final

Awards

Player of the Month

PFAI Players' Young Player of the Year

References

Dundalk
Dundalk F.C. seasons